Diervilla rivularis is a species of flowering plant in the honeysuckle family known by the common names mountain bush-honeysuckle and hairy bush-honeysuckle. It is native to the eastern United States, where it is limited to the southern Appalachian Mountains. It occurs in Alabama, Georgia and Tennessee. It is extirpated from North Carolina.

Flowers are trumpet-shaped, two-lipped, and pale yellow to greenish yellow. Leaves are simple, hairy and opposite, oval or elliptical. This plant grows in moist wooded areas and disturbed areas such as roadsides. It occurs at middle to higher elevations in its range. The Latin specific epithet rivularis means loving brooks. It refers to the plant's preference of growing in moist habitats.

The plant is considered "somewhat threatened" by habitat loss due to land-use conversion, habitat fragmentation, and forest management practices.

Gallery

References

External links
USDA Plants Profile for Diervilla rivularis (mountain bush-honeysuckle)

Caprifoliaceae
Flora of the Appalachian Mountains
Endemic flora of the United States
Flora of Alabama
Flora of Georgia (U.S. state)
Flora of Tennessee